Les S. Ihara Jr. (born April 19, 1951 in Honolulu, Hawaii) is an American politician and a Democratic member of the Hawaii Senate since January 16, 2013 representing District 10. Ihara served consecutively from 1995 until 2013 in the District 9 and District 10 seats, having served consecutively in the Hawaii State Legislature from 1987 until 1995 in the Hawaii House of Representatives.

Education
Ihara attended George Washington University and earned his BA in liberal studies from the University of Hawaii.

Elections
1986 Ihara was initially elected the Hawaii House of Representatives in the November 4, 1986 General election.
1988 Ihara was re-elected in the November 8, 1988 General election.
1990 Ihara was re-elected in the November 6, 1990 General election.
1992 Ihara won the House District 19 September 19, 1992 Democratic Primary with 2,583 votes (67.7%), and won the November 3, 1992 General election with 5,971 votes (69.1%) against Libertarian candidate Merrielea Dolle.
1994 Ihara won the Senate District 10 September 17, 1994 Democratic Primary with 4,637 votes (65.2%), and the November 8, 1994 General election with 8,032 votes (59.5%) against Republican nominee Steve Colt.
1998 Ihara was unopposed for the September 19, 1998 Democratic Primary, winning with 2,362 votes, and won the November 3, 1998 General election with 9,241 votes (67.8%) against Republican nominee Darrel Gardner.
2002 Redistricted to District 9, and with Democratic Senator Matt Matsunaga running for Lieutenant Governor of Hawaii, Ihara was unopposed for the September 21, 2002 Democratic Primary, winning with 6,264 votes, and won the November 5, 2002 General election with 11,328 votes (61.1%) against Republican nominee Gladys Hayes.
2006 Ihara won the September 26, 2006 Democratic Primary with 6,666 votes (55.7%); his Republican opponent from 2002, Gladys Hayes won her primary, also, setting up a rematch. Ihara won the November 7, 2006 General election with 11,599 votes (72.3%) against Hayes.
2010 Ihara won the September 18, 2010 Democratic Primary with 7,841 votes (66.4%), and won the November 2, 2010 General election with 11,058 votes (64.7%) against Republican nominee Lisa Shorba.
2012 Redistricted back to District 10, and with Democratic Senator Brian Taniguchi redistricted to District 11, Ihara was unopposed for the August 11, 2012 Democratic Primary, winning with 8,595 votes, and won the November 6, 2012 General election with 13,703 votes (69.0%) against Republican nominee Eric Marshall, who had run for the seat in 2010.

References

External links
Official page at the Hawaii State Legislature
Campaign site
 

1951 births
Living people
George Washington University alumni
Democratic Party Hawaii state senators
Democratic Party members of the Hawaii House of Representatives
Politicians from Honolulu
University of Hawaiʻi at Mānoa alumni
Hawaii politicians of Japanese descent
21st-century American politicians